Alexandru Rusu (22 November 1884 – 9 May 1963) was a Romanian bishop of the Greek-Catholic Church. One of twelve children born to a priest in Șăulia Commune, Mureș County, he was himself ordained a priest in 1910. Rusu was ordained Bishop of Maramureş in 1931.

After the church's leadership fell vacant in 1941, he was chosen its new head (Major Archbishop of Fagaraş and Alba Iulia) in 1946, a decision approved by the Holy See but not by the Communist-dominated Petru Groza government. Rusu was arrested in October 1948 by the authorities of the new Communist regime which had outlawed the church, and he was held in two monasteries, in Sighet prison, and then in two other monasteries. In 1957, a military tribunal found him guilty of "instigation and high treason". Rusu was sentenced to 25 years of imprisonment and he ended up at Gherla prison, where he died of illness.

On 19 March 2019, Pope Francis approved the beatification of Rusu and six other Greek-Catholic bishops who died while serving as political prisoners under the communist regime in Romania in the mid-20th century. Rusu and the other six Romanian Catholic prelates were beatified personally by Pope Francis at Liberty Field in Blaj, Romania by Pope Francis on 2 June 2019.

References

1884 births
1963 deaths
People from Mureș County
Primates of the Romanian Greek Catholic Church
Romanian anti-communist clergy
Romanian beatified people
People convicted of treason against Romania
Inmates of Sighet prison
Inmates of Gherla prison
Romanian people who died in prison custody
Prisoners who died in Securitate custody
19th-century Romanian people
20th-century Eastern Catholic archbishops
20th-century Romanian people
Venerated Catholics
Beatifications by Pope Francis
Eastern Catholic bishops in Romania